Tilt is the second studio album by Australian electro pop band, Confidence Man. It was announced on 10 November 2021, alongside the album's lead single, "Holiday" and released on 1 April 2022. According to the album's announcement press release, the album is "fierce, flirty and full of anthems" and listeners "might need to sit down before you hit play".

At the 2022 ARIA Music Awards, the album was nominated for Best Dance/Electronic Release.

Reception

Tilt received generally favorable reviews from music critics. At Metacritic, which assigns a normalized rating out of 100 to reviews from mainstream critics, the album received an average score of 80, based on nine reviews.
 
Neil Z. Yeung from AllMusic wrote: "Four years after their painfully hip debut, Confident Music for Confident People, Australia's Confidence Man amassed even more of their titular surety, letting their guard down and fully embracing their dance roots on the celebratory Tilt. While the devastating cool of their first album made it feel like trying to get into a club with a high cover charge, Tilt throws the doors open and invites everyone to the party, going full-bore on a collection of '90s house-indebted thrills that uplift listeners to another plane of pure euphoria." concluding saying, "The cathartic release is absolutely joyous on this stylish party album, a heaping dose of maximalist escapism from a quartet that just wants you to dance your cares away."

Patrick Clarke from NME called it "a decidedly different experience to its predecessor" saying "it's less silly but more assured, happy to let pumping '90s-indebted rave instrumentals take centre stage as often as Planet and Bones' storytelling." Clarke also said "Tilt is a record that proves that campness and ridiculousness doesn't have to come at the expense of real depth."

Niamh Carey from The Skinny said "Tilt is a euphoric album that audaciously borrows from early 90s dance anthems. It is great fun; the production expertly reproduces the sounds of a particularly interesting time for electronic music without taking itself too seriously."

Track listing
 "Woman" – 4:28
 "Feels Like a Different Thing" – 3:47	
 "What I Like" – 3:23
 "Toy Boy" – 3:30	
 "Luvin U Is Easy" – 4:24	
 "Holiday" – 4:48	
 "Trumpet Song" – 3:23	
 "Angry Girl" – 2:52
 "Push It Up" – 3:24
 "Kiss N Tell" – 0:54
 "Break It Bought It" – 3:42
 "Relieve the Pressure" – 6:09

Charts

References

2022 albums
Confidence Man (band) albums